The 2009 Pacific Life Pacific-10 Conference men's basketball tournament began with the first round on March 11, 2009 at Staples Center in Los Angeles, California, with quarterfinals on March 12, semifinals on March 13, and the finals on March 14 (3:00 p.m. PT). In front of a crowd of 16,988, #6 seed USC defeated #4 seed Arizona State for the Pac-10 Tournament Championship, which was the first and only time for their program. This was also the first time a team seeded sixth in the tournament went on to win the championship, although it would happen again three years later. The Trojans  received the conference's automatic bid to the NCAA National Tournament.

Seeds

All Pacific-10 schools played in the tournament. Teams are seeded by conference record, with a tiebreaker system used to seed teams with identical conference records.

2009 Pac-10 tournament
Game time: First round – March 11, 6:00 p.m. & 8:30 p.m.; Quarterfinals – March 12, 12:00 p.m., 2:30 p.m., 6:00 p.m. & 8:30 p.m.; Semi-finals – March 13, 6:00 p.m. & 8:30 p.m.; Championship game – March 14, 3:00 p.m. (Pacific time)

Tournament notes
Washington Huskies won the Pac-10 regular season title with a win over Arizona, 83–78, on Saturday, February 28, 2009, ending UCLA's three-year reign. They then went on to defeat Washington State, 67–60, for their first outright conference title since 1953.
The Oregon State Beavers are coached by President Obama's brother-in-law, Craig Robinson, who in his first season has improved the team's last year record of 5–25, finishing with 13 regular season wins.
 As a part of the tournament, a Pride of the Pac-10 luncheon was held on Friday, March 13, to honor the 2007-2008 Pac-10 Medal Winners, male and female athletes from each school for their excellence in athletics, academics and community service.
 Regular season honors: James Harden, Arizona State, player of the year; Isaiah Thomas, Washington, freshman of the year; Taj Gibson, USC, defensive player of the year; Justin Dentmon, Washington, most improved player of the year; Lorenzo Romar, Washington, coach of the year.
 Game officials for the championship game were Dick Cartmell, Dave Libbey and Michael Reed.
 This tournament had not one but two pairs of arch-rivals meet (a first). Arizona and ASU met (for the 2nd time in tournament history) in the second round and UCLA met USC (also for the 2nd time in tournament history) in the third round.
 Six teams were invited to play in the 2009 NCAA Men's Basketball Division I Championship: Washington, UCLA, California, Arizona State, USC, and Arizona.

All-Tournament Team
Daniel Hackett, USC
Taj Gibson, USC
Derek Glasser, Arizona State
James Harden, Arizona State
Jeff Pendergraph, Arizona State

Most Outstanding Player
DeMar DeRozan, USC

2009 Hall of Honor inductees

Pac-10 men’s basketball Hall of Honor banquet was held on Saturday, March 14, 2009 to honor the following individuals from each of the Pac-10 member schools.
 Lute Olson – Arizona 
 Royce Youree – Arizona State 
 Nibs Price – Cal
 Michael Warren – UCLA 
 Greg Ballard – Oregon 
 Paul Valenti – Oregon State
 Gus Williams – USC 
 Jim Pollard – Stanford 
 Detlef Schrempf – Washington
 Isaac Fontaine – Washington State

See also
2009 NCAA Men's Division I Basketball Tournament
Pacific-10 Conference men's basketball tournament
2008–09 Pacific-10 Conference men's basketball standings

References

External links
 Pac-10 Basketball Tournament site

Pac-12 Conference men's basketball tournament